The 2023 Lithuanian Swimming Championships are scheduled to be held from 12 to 15 April 2023 at the Girstutis pool & sport center in Kaunas, Lithuania. This swimming meet is a qualifying event for the 2024 Summer Olympics.

Medal winners
The medallist for the events are below.

Men's events

Women's events

Mixed events

References

Swimming Championships
Lithuanian championships
Lithuanian Swimming Championships
Sports competitions in Kaunas